A small village in district Kurukshetra of Haryana state. The village is situated at distance of 12km from Shahbad Markanda city. Only Saini community with a single Sharma family are living in this village. The village was formed in 1947 when Saini community of near by Village of Nalvi, decided to live in their farms. 

Villages in Kurukshetra district